Robert Hamill may refer to: 
 Killing of Robert Hamill (died 1997) Irish Catholic civilian
 Robert Hamill Inquiry
 Red Hamill (1917–1985) Professional ice hockey player
 Rob Hamill (born 1964) New Zealand rower and political candidate

See also